José Rafael Santiago Fuentes (born November 5, 1974) is a former Major League Baseball pitcher. Listed at 6' 3" , 200 lb. , Santiago batted and threw right-handed. He was born in Fajardo, Puerto Rico.

Playing career
Santiago was drafted by the Kansas City Royals in the 70th round of the 1994 Major League Baseball draft. The Phillies released him after the  season. In , he signed a minor league contract with the New York Mets and was called up to the majors in July.

After that, Santiago was a member of the Puerto Rico national team in the 2006 World Baseball Classic and joined the Olmecas de Tabasco for the rest of the summer.

In addition to playing for the New Orleans Zephyrs in the Mets farm system In , Santiago pitched for the Gigantes de Carolina Puerto Rico representing team in the Caribbean Series. He retired after that season.

In between, Santiago played winter ball with the Cardenales de Lara and Leones del Caracas clubs of the Venezuelan Professional Baseball League.

Retirement

Coaching
After retiring, Santiago became a pitching coach. In 2015, he took over the role for the Gigantes de Carolina of the Liga Profesional Roberto Clemente. After coincidentally meeting Edwin Díaz during the 2016 offseason, Santiago began training the then-Seattle Mariners reliever.

Other baseball initiatives
Santiago also serves other roles within baseball, such as that of pitching coach of several teams of the local Doble A amateur league including Cocoteros de Loiza, Guardianes de Dorado, Halcones de Gurabo and currently the Artesanos de Las Piedras. In 2016, he served as the head pitching coach of MLB's Development Program in Puerto Rico, then he was recruited by local baseball academies such as PRoBaseball Academy and IBAHS. Santiago runs a college placement program in Puerto Rico called Optimus Prospects Baseball Academy. He also leads a baseball initiative based in the municipality of Loíza.

Personal life
Santiago is currently living in his hometown of Loiza, Puerto Rico with his wife and former sports reporter, Sarai Colon. He has two children, Joselyn Marie and Ian Jareb Santiago. Santiago is a horse racing aficionado and has owned several thoroughbreds that competed at Hipódromo Camarero. He was also a known breeder for cockfights in Puerto Rico, where that sport was legal until 2019.

References

External links
, or Retrosheet, or Pura Pelota (VPBL stats)

1974 births
Living people
Buffalo Bisons (minor league) players
Cardenales de Lara players
Charlotte Knights players
Cleveland Indians players
Dorados de Chihuahua players
Gigantes de Carolina players
Gulf Coast Royals players
Kansas City Royals players
Lansing Lugnuts players
Leones del Caracas players
Major League Baseball pitchers
Major League Baseball players from Puerto Rico
Mexican League baseball pitchers
New Orleans Zephyrs players
New York Mets players
Norfolk Tides players
Olmecas de Tabasco players
Omaha Golden Spikes players
Omaha Royals players
People from Fajardo, Puerto Rico
Puerto Rican expatriate baseball players in Mexico
Philadelphia Phillies players
Scranton/Wilkes-Barre Red Barons players
Spokane Indians players
Wichita Wranglers players
Wilmington Blue Rocks players
2006 World Baseball Classic players
Puerto Rican expatriate baseball players in Venezuela
Puerto Rican expatriate baseball players in Taiwan
Macoto Cobras players